Sierra Amerrisque Nature Reserve is a nature reserve in Nicaragua. It was protected on 4 November 1991, and covers 19,195 hectares. It is one of 78 Nicaraguan reserves under official protection.

References

Protected areas of Nicaragua
Central American pine–oak forests